Politics of Florida reflect a state that has experienced conflict between its liberal southern region and its traditionally conservative northern region. Politics often revolve around budgeting and how money for budgets should be raised.

Florida was originally part of the Solid South, as Democrats overwhelmingly won state and federal elections during the hundred years following the Civil War. However, in 1937, the requirement to pay a poll tax was repealed by the state legislature, allowing poorer Floridians to vote, and coupled with a growing tourist industry in the mid-20th century that attracted Northern retirees, the state became electorally competitive earlier than the rest of the South. Since 1928, the state has only voted for the losing presidential candidate three times, all for losing Republicans in 1960, 1992, and 2020. In 1966, Claude Kirk was elected the first Republican governor of Florida since Reconstruction. This was followed in 1968, with Republicans winning a Senate seat in the state for the first time since Reconstruction. 

The Florida Elections Commission was established in 1973. In 2005, Jeb Bush signed a bill to abolish primary runoff elections, resulting in all primary and general elections being determined by plurality rather than majority. 

The state is dominated by Republicans on the state level, as Democrats have not held the governorship or either house of the legislature since 1999. Republicans currently have veto-proof majorities in both houses of the Florida legislature. However, the state has become increasingly red since the late 2010s, as in 2018, Republicans captured both Senate seats in the state for the first time since Reconstruction. In 2020, Florida voted 7.8 points right of the nation as a whole, the furthest it has voted from the nation since 1988, and it was the first election since 1992 that Florida backed the losing candidate. In 2022, Republicans won their largest statewide victories since Reconstruction and neared 60% of the vote. In 2021, registered Republicans surpassed Democrats for the first time in state history.

Florida approved its lottery by amending the constitution in 1984. It approved slot machines in Broward and Miami-Dade County in 2004. It has disapproved casinos (outside of sovereign Seminole and Miccosukee tribal areas) three times:  1978, 1986, and 1994.

Federal representation

Florida currently has 28 House districts In the 118th Congress, 8 of Florida's seats are held by Democrats and 20 are held by Republicans. There are as follows:

Florida's 1st congressional district represented by Matt Gaetz (R)
Florida's 2nd congressional district represented by Neal Dunn (R)
Florida's 3rd congressional district represented by Kat Cammack (R)
Florida's 4th congressional district represented by Aaron Bean (R)
Florida's 5th congressional district represented by John Rutherford (R)
Florida's 6th congressional district represented by Michael Waltz (R)
Florida's 7th congressional district represented by Cory Mills (R)
Florida's 8th congressional district represented by Bill Posey (R)
Florida's 9th congressional district represented by Darren Soto (D)
Florida's 10th congressional district represented by Maxwell Frost (D)
Florida's 11th congressional district represented by Daniel Webster (R)
Florida's 12th congressional district represented by Gus Bilirakis (R)
Florida's 13th congressional district represented by Anna Paulina Luna (R)
Florida's 14th congressional district represented by Kathy Castor (D)
Florida's 15th congressional district represented by Laurel Lee (R)
Florida's 16th congressional district represented by Vern Buchanan (R)
Florida's 17th congressional district represented by Greg Steube (R)
Florida's 18th congressional district represented by Scott Franklin (R)
Florida's 19th congressional district represented by Byron Donalds (R)
Florida's 20th congressional district represented by Sheila Cherfilus-McCormick (D)
Florida's 21st congressional district represented by Brian Mast (R)
Florida's 22nd congressional district represented by Lois Frankel (D)
Florida's 23rd congressional district represented by Jared Moskowitz (D)
Florida's 24th congressional district represented by Frederica Wilson (D)
Florida's 25th congressional district represented by Debbie Wasserman Schultz (D)
Florida's 26th congressional district represented by Mario Diaz-Balart (R)
Florida's 27th congressional district represented by Maria Elvira Salazar (R)
Florida's 28th congressional district represented by Carlos A. Giménez (R)

Florida's two United States Senators are Republicans Marco Rubio and Rick Scott, serving since 2010 and 2019, respectively. 

Florida is part of the United States District Court for the Northern District of Florida, United States District Court for the Middle District of Florida, and the United States District Court for the Southern District of Florida in the federal judiciary. The district's cases are appealed to the Atlanta-based United States Court of Appeals for the Eleventh Circuit.

Issues

Budget
Florida is one of the nine states that do not impose a personal income tax (list of others). The state had imposed a tax on "intangible personal property" (stocks, bonds, mutual funds, money market funds, etc.), but this tax was abolished after 2006. The state sales tax rate is 6%. Local governments may levy an additional local option sales tax of up to 1.5%. A locale's use tax rate is the same as its sales tax rate, including local options, if any. Use taxes are payable for purchases made out of state and brought into Florida within six months of the purchase date. Documentary stamps are required on deed transfers and mortgages. Other taxes include corporate income, communication services, unemployment, solid waste, insurance premium, pollutants, and various fuel taxes.

Florida has a balanced budget provision, requiring the state not to have a budget deficit. The requirement for a balanced budget does not appear as such in the Florida Constitution. Article VII, Section 1(d), Florida Constitution, provides: "Provision shall be made by law for raising sufficient revenue to defray the expenses of the state for each fiscal period." Article III, Section 19(a), Florida Constitution, provides for "Annual Budgeting." These two provisions, when read together, form the basis for the balanced annual budget requirement.

Florida's state budget is funded one-third from General Revenue and two-thirds from hundreds of trust funds. The General Revenue portion of Florida's state budget is funded primarily by sales tax, while local governments also have their own respective budgets funded primarily by property taxes. The annual state budget is constructed by the legislature and signed into law by the governor who administers it. The state budget for 2008-9 was $66 billion.

In 2008, the state was one of four that had fully funded pension systems for government employees, including teachers. There are five classes of state employees for pension investment: Regular and Special Risk Administrative employees accrue retirement benefits at 1.6–1.68% per year; Senior Management, 2%; Special Risk employees, such as police and firefighters, 3%; and elected officers, including judges and legislative at 3% to 3.3%. The higher rate for the latter is to encourage early retirement. In 2010 there were 304,000 state retirees and 655,000 active employees. The average teacher's retirement check is  $1,868 monthly. The average regular-class retiree gets $970 per month.

In 2011 to 2012 fiscal year, the state collected over $2.2 billion from the tax on gasoline.

In 2011, Medicaid costs were 20% of the budget. These are mandated by the federal government. While the state administers the program, it has no actual control over expenses. From 2000 to 2010, Medicaid costs rose from $8 billion to $18 billion.

Education costs were 30% of the budget.

The $70 billion budget for 2010–11 contained the following allocations:
Health and Social Services $30 billion
Education $21.2 billion
Transportation $7.9 billion
Criminal Justice and Corrections $4.5 billion
General government $4 billion
Natural Resources and Environment $3 billion
Reserves $2.28 billion
Courts $459 million

In 2011, undocumented immigrants were estimated to cost the Florida government $700 million. This included $548 million for children (excluding American-born children of undocumented aliens). Average student cost is $9,035. There are an estimated 60,750 undocumented immigrant children of school age. There are 5,641 undocumented in Florida prisons at an average cost of $18,980 annually, for a total of $107 million. A 2003 study indicated unpaid hospital costs of $40 million annually.

High-level state officers use one of two airplanes to get around Florida. Flights take 90 minutes to get from the capital at Tallahassee to Miami. In February 2011, Governor Scott directed the sale of both airplanes.

Employees
In 2011, as a result of Governor Rick Scott's executive order, the department required that all workers be verified as U.S. citizens with e-verify. This applied to contracts and funds otherwise under the jurisdiction of local government.

Statutes

Real estate
Florida is one of several states where the courts are required to be involved in every step of the foreclosure process. By 2012, it took three years to complete the process. In nonjudicial states, it takes an average of 100 days. As a result of the United States housing bubble, there is a large backlog of housing that is in the foreclosure process but unavailable to the market. This overhang has had a detrimental effect on the housing market.

Gun laws

Florida is considered "accommodating" to guns, by national standards. There are 56 laws relating to owning, transporting, and using guns. Open carrying of firearms is nearly always illegal. Convicted felons have few rights to gun possession.

Merchandising alcohol in bulk
Florida has a 3-tier system requiring a producer, a wholesaler and a retailer. A franchise law designates who can market what alcoholic beverages where.

See also
Elections in Florida
Florida Democratic Party
Florida Student Association exercises constitutional and statutory powers
Government of Florida
Political party strength in Florida
Republican Party of Florida

Notes

External links